is a Japanese multimedia franchise created by Bandai and WiZ in 2003. The franchise began with a manga created by Rin Hirai and illustrated by Makoto Haruno, first serialized in Shueisha's Monthly Shōnen Jump in Japan. The manga was published in English by Viz Media in 2005.

The anime,   is animated by Studio Gallop, directed by Akitaro Daichi, and aired on Fuji TV from April 2004 to March 2005. A pilot for an English dub of the series was produced for Hasbro, but was not picked up.

Plot and setting 

The story opens with the discovery of the "Soul Dolls" which contain legendary creatures of incredible power within them. The Dark Wiz company (DWC) wants access to all of them for unknown reasons, but four of the Soul Dolls go missing. The majority of the anime takes place in Brooklyn, New York City, with the Brooklyn Bridge as a much-featured landmark.

Media

Manga
The Legendz manga was written by Rin Hirai and illustrated by Makoto Haruno. The manga was originally published in Shueisha's Monthly Shonen Jump from 2003 – 2005. The series was translated and adapted into English by Viz Media and released in four volumes with the first release in March 2005.

The story is about Ken Kazaki, a boy who attends Ryudo Elementary School. Together with Shiron, his faithful Windragon, fights with other people who like him breed monsters. Ken later participates in the Legendz Carnival.

Anime 

The anime was directed by Akitaro Daichi with character designs by Nagisa Miyazaki. The animation was produced by Studio Gallop. The sound director was Kazuya Tanaka. The two ending themes are "Dounimo Tomaranai~Nonstop" by Brenda Vaughn, from episode 1 through 37 and another version performed by Linda Yamamoto from 38-49. The anime ran on Fuji TV April 4, 2004, to March 27, 2005.

Home media

Video games 
 is a Game Boy Advance game that was produced by Bandai Co., Ltd. and released on July 29, 2004. The video game includes a unique accessory to "Reborn" the Legendz with a link cable connected to the "Soul Doll". Using the dedicated adapter, the Legendz can adventure automatically and the player can view these events as flashbacks. The game also provided growth of the Legendz through sharing with other players.

The video game,  is an action game for the PlayStation 2, originally released on December 16, 2004. Produced by Bandai Co., Ltd., it has a CERO rating for "All ages" and supports two player play. The game features more than 60 Legendz that the player uses to battle.

The game requires the "Soul Doll" adapter, two versions were sold; one for players who already have the "Legendz: Island of Ordeal" and one which included the Soul Doll adapter. The game included the ability to "rewrite the IC data" to allow the player to create their own Legendz.

Reception 
The Anime Encyclopedia: A Guide to Japanese Animation Since 1917 makes note of the similarities to Dragon Drive in the introduction of Shu and Shiron. It also notes the similarities to Pokémon except with dragons and director Daichi's "stylistic similarities" to Grrl Power. The manga review compendium Manga: The Complete Guide praised the "elaborate universe" and "quirky artwork", but noted that the creatures were "bland".

References

External links
 Legendz Anime Site
 Legendz manga site
 

2003 manga
2004 anime television series debuts
2000s toys
Bandai Namco franchises
Bandai Visual
Comics set in New York City
Gallop (studio)
Dragons in popular culture
Fantasy anime and manga
Fuji TV original programming
Shōnen manga
Shueisha manga
Television shows set in New York City
Toy brands
Viz Media manga